Abdullah Al Kuwari (Arabic:عبد الله الكواري) (born 26 June 1988) is a Qatari footballer.

External links
 

Qatari footballers
1988 births
Living people
Al Ahli SC (Doha) players
Qatar SC players
Al Kharaitiyat SC players
Qatar Stars League players
Qatari Second Division players
Association football wingers